The 2004 Kisima Music Awards featured a newly expanded scheme which aimed to incorporate artists from across East Africa, most predominantly Uganda and Tanzania. It was also a source of controversy when the organisation's CEO Tedd Josiah was awarded the category for Best Producer. The ceremony was hosted by veteran music artist Eric Wainaina and radio presenters Patricia Amira and Robert Warobi.

Winners

See also

Kisima Music Awards

External links
2004 Kisima Award Winners

Kisima Music Award winners